The Cottage School, often referred to as TCS or Cottage, is a special education school located in Roswell, Georgia, United States. It focuses on middle school and high school students with special needs.

References

External links
 The Cottage School website

Educational institutions established in 1983
Schools in Fulton County, Georgia
Special schools in the United States
Special education
1983 establishments in Georgia (U.S. state)